Locust tree can mean:

 Any of a number of tree species in the genera Gleditsia or Robinia, including:
 Honey locust (Gleditsia triacanthos), a leguminous tree with pods having a sweet, edible pulp
 Black locust (Robinia pseudoacacia), a leguminous tree with toxic pods
 Water locust (Gleditsia aquatica), a leguminous tree with one seed per pod
 Or less commonly, "African locust bean tree" (Parkia biglobosa), which is also known as néré
 Also not commonly, the carob tree, Ceratonia siliqua, whose pods are called locust beans.

Etymology 
"Locust" comes from the Latin locusta, meaning both "locust" (the insect) and "lobster". By analogy with a levantine use of the Greek word for the insect, akris,  for the pods of the carob tree which supposedly resembled it, the pod-bearing North American tree was called "locust" starting in the 1630s.

References